Língua dos Pês (Portuguese, P Language) is a language game spoken in Brazil and Portugal with Portuguese. It is also known in other languages, such as Dutch, Afrikaans, and Estonian.

Function

There are at least three different "dialects," or variations, of Língua do Pê.

"Double talk" dialect

This "dialect" of Língua do Pê is just like the Jeringonza and the Idioma F language games in Spanish.  It works by repeating the rime of each syllable, beginning it with p (pê in Portuguese).  Examples:

 você → vo-po-cê-pê
 gato → ga-pa-to-po
 menino → me-pe-ni-pi-no-po

Vowel-changing dialect

This "dialect" is like the one described above, except that some vowels are changed.

 Example:

 
 Você cortou o seu cabelo? (Did you cut your hair?)

Please note that the syllables beginning with p are stressed, not the original syllables.

"Pê" dialect

This "dialect" is more like Kongarian (a language game spoken with Hungarian) than the other "dialects" of Língua do Pê.  To speak it, the syllable pê is inserted before every syllable. This is the variant most used in Brazilian Portuguese, while the others are more common in European Portuguese.

 Example:

 pêLem pêBra pêCo pêMo pêE pêRa pêLe pêGal?
 Lembra como era legal? (Do you remember how cool it was?)

Dutch

In the Netherlands and Belgium, the most common version is to insert the syllable "ep" before every sonant. Another version is to add the syllable "p" after every sonant and repeat that sonant.

Example:

De boer woont op het platteland. (The farmer lives in the countryside.)
Depe bepoer wepoont epop hepet plepattepelepand.
Depe boepoer woopoont opop hepet plapattepelapand.

External links
 "A Língua do Pê." Online: <https://web.archive.org/web/20050518074914/http://jangadabrasil.com.br/dezembro/ca41200b.htm> October 1, 2005.
 "Introdução à Criptologia." Online: <https://web.archive.org/web/20040127104620/http://www.numaboa.com.br/criptologia/intro.php> October 1, 2005.
 "Sum: Pig Latins." Online: <http://linguistlist.org/issues/8/8-1079.html> October 1, 2005.

See also

 Language game
 Jeringonza

Language games
Portuguese language
Brazilian games